The 1940 Georgia Tech Yellow Jackets football team represented the Georgia Tech Yellow Jackets of the Georgia Institute of Technology during the 1940 college football season.

Schedule

References

Georgia Tech
Georgia Tech Yellow Jackets football seasons
Georgia Tech Yellow Jackets football